List of Go organizations:

International 
 International Go Federation (IGF) (1982)

Continental 
In 2021:

 European Go Federation (2010) (EGF), for Europe
 Asian Go Federation (2015), for Asia
 Ibero-American Go Federation (Federación Iberoamericana de Go) (2009), for Ibero-America
 World Pair Go Association (2009), for World
 Ing Changk Wei-Chi Education Foundation (2012)
 Iwamoto North America Foundation for Go (2014)

National

See also

 List of professional Go tournaments
 List of Go players
 Kansai Ki-in
 All Japan Student Go Federation

References

External links 
The Iwamoto North America Foundation for Go (INAF)

 
Organizations
go